Blue Smoke is a 2007 American romantic drama television film directed by David Carson and starring Alicia Witt, Matthew Settle, and Scott Bakula. Written by Ronni Kern, based on the 2005 Nora Roberts novel of the same name, the film is about a beautiful arson investigator whose boyfriends are murdered in fires set by a stalker who traumatized her years earlier. The film debuted February 12, 2007 on Lifetime Television.

Plot
After watching a fire burn her family's Baltimore pizzeria to the ground, 11‑year-old Reena Hale (Witt) decides she wants to be an arson investigator when she grows up. And with the help of mentor John Minger (Bakula), whom she met during the investigation of her family's restaurant, Reena realizes her dream.

Years later, the grown up Reena buys a house in the old neighborhood, moving in next door to carpenter Bo Goodnight (Settle). As Reena and Bo embark on a relationship, a psychopathic arsonist from her past begins wreaking havoc on her life. Reena's stalker threatens her life, and those of her loved ones.

Cast
 Alicia Witt as Reena Hale
 Scott Bakula as John Minger
 Matthew Settle as Bo Goodnight
 Talia Shire as Bianca Hale
 Eric Keenleyside as Gib Hale
 John Reardon as Josh
 Benjamin Ayres as Hugh
 Chris Fassbender as Joey Pastorelli Jr.
 Taylor Dauphinais as Young Reena
 David Lawrence Brown as Joe Pastorelli Sr.
 Liam Nelson as Young Joey Pastorelli Jr.
 Rod Heatheringston as Steve
 Chad Nobert as Xander Hale
 Peter Skagen as FBI Agent 
 Daniela Vlaskalic as Fran Hale

Production
The executive producers of the film were Stephanie Germain and Peter Guber; they were also executive producers for seven other Nora Roberts films for Lifetime in 2007 and 2009. Blue Smoke was filmed on location in Calgary, Alberta, Canada between October 30 and November 24, 2006.

References

External links
 
 
 
 

2007 television films
2007 films
American romantic drama films
Films based on American novels
Films based on works by Nora Roberts
Films directed by David Carson
Films set in Baltimore
Lifetime (TV network) films
American mystery thriller films
American thriller television films
American drama television films
2000s English-language films
2000s American films